Cara Black and Liezel Huber were the defending champions, but they chose not to compete together.
Black partnered up with Elena Vesnina, but they lost to Chan Yung-jan and Zheng Jie in the first round.
Huber teamed with Anabel Medina Garrigues, but they lost to Chuang Chia-jung and Vania King in the second round.
Venus and Serena Williams won in the final 6–2, 7–5 against Gisela Dulko and Flavia Pennetta.

Seeds
The top four seeds received a bye into the second round.

Draw

Finals

Top half

Bottom half

References
Main Draw

WD